Shirley Jean Rickert (March 25, 1926 – February 6, 2009) was an American child actress who was briefly the "blonde girl" for the Our Gang series in 1931, during the Hal Roach early talkie period.

Career

At 18 months of age, Rickert won a local baby beauty contest, which emboldened her mother to move the family to Hollywood. She made her screen debut at the age of four in the short How's My Baby (1930), soon followed by her Our Gang debut, Helping Grandma in 1931. Rickert's most notable appearances were in the films Love Business and Bargain Day, in which her spit-curls, inspired by those of Ruth Taylor's in Gentlemen Prefer Blondes, were the centerpiece of her precocious performance.

After Rickert left the Our Gang series, she had a brief movie career, including starring roles as Tomboy Teri Taylor alongside Mickey Rooney in eight Mickey McGuire comedies, followed by a string of jobs including driving trucks for the U.S. Army Air Corps during World War II. She later worked in burlesque as an exotic dancer, billed as Gilda and Her Crowning Glory (after her long blonde hair), retiring from burlesque in 1959.

In the mid-1970s, she became a traveling saleswoman for industrial hardware, surprising potential clients with her starring roles in Our Gang. Later, she performed in local theater productions, helped to maintain a Web fansite, and made occasional public appearances. She also sold her crafts at a local shop with her daughter's family.

Death
Rickert died in a nursing home on February 6, 2009, after a long illness.

Filmography

References

External links

 
 
 Shirley Jean Rickert's home page
 Rickerts with childhood photo of herself in Little Rascals
 

American child actresses
American burlesque performers
People from Saratoga Springs, New York
Actresses from Seattle
Actors from Springfield, Massachusetts
20th-century American actresses
1926 births
2009 deaths
Our Gang
21st-century American women